YouTube Rewind (stylized as YouTube ЯEWIND) is a discontinued annual video series that was produced and created by YouTube and Portal A Interactive from 2010 to 2019. The videos were an overview and a recap of each year's viral videos, events, trends, and music. The series' annual installments were uploaded onto YouTube's official channel.

The 2018 installment of the series, YouTube Rewind 2018: Everyone Controls Rewind, was panned by critics, YouTubers and viewers alike, garnering over 10 million dislikes in its first two weeks, and becoming the most disliked video of all time on YouTube. The next installment, YouTube Rewind 2019: For the Record, also had a poor reception from viewers. Rewind did not return for 2020 due to the COVID-19 pandemic, and YouTube announced the following year that the series would be discontinued.

History
The first Rewind was created by YouTube in 2010 and featured a list of the 50 most popular YouTube videos of that year. In 2010, YouTube began creating and producing Rewind videos with the help of Seedwell and Portal A Interactive. From 2011 onwards, the Rewind videos have only been uploaded to the YouTube Spotlight channel, now known as just YouTube, with additional behind-the-scenes content.

2010
On December 13, 2010, the first YouTube Rewind was uploaded, titled 2010 YouTube Rewind: Year in Review and featured the top ten most popular videos of the year on YouTube. It was uploaded on two channels: YouTube Trends on the first day, and YouTube Spotlight on the second.

2011
On December 20, 2011, YouTube Rewind 2011 was uploaded. It was created and produced by YouTube and Portal A Interactive, and features Rebecca Black, whose music video of her song "Friday" had gone viral in March of that year, as the host. Like in 2010, it featured another top ten most popular videos of the year on YouTube.

2012
In 2012, YouTube's Rewind videos changed to featuring several popular YouTubers; the most popular music videos, and videos; breaking news; and internet memes from the year. Rewind YouTube Style 2012, referencing Psy's "Gangnam Style", was released on December 17, 2012. It was created and produced by YouTube and Seedwell. 

The video starts with the text "Nothing is more powerful than a video whose time has come"; the final two words change to "is 2012.", with an accompanying string instrument sound, resembling the introduction of Kony 2012, a viral documentary film aired earlier that year.

2013

On December 11, 2013, YouTube Rewind: What Does 2013 Say?, referencing Ylvis' "The Fox (What Does the Fox Say?)", was released. The video also made prominent use of Psy's "Gentleman", however, following a copyright claim from the artist, the video was amended in 2015 to remove the song. The video was created and produced by YouTube and Portal A Interactive. This was the first year that the YouTube Rewind Button was used; otherwise, the video was stylistically similar to the 2012 video. DJ Earworm served as the music producer for the video, mashing up six popular songs of the year. Jimmy Fallon and The Roots from The Tonight Show made guest appearances. It also marked the first appearance of PewDiePie in the Rewind series.

What Does 2013 Say? was dedicated to fellow YouTuber Talia Castellano, who died on July 16, five months prior to the release of the video.

2014
On December 9, 2014, YouTube Rewind: Turn Down for 2014, referencing DJ Snake and Lil Jon's "Turn Down for What", was released. It was again created and produced by YouTube and Portal A Interactive. Over 10 songs were mashed-up by DJ Earworm for the video. The video was not structured around songs, as in previous years, with more Internet memes and trends used alongside the music. Its main feature was the YouTube Rewind Button flag, with which YouTubers and other notable personalities run throughout the video. The flag was run through the sets of The Colbert Report by Big Bird; Conan by host Conan O'Brien himself, with Freddie Wong acting as substitute host; and Last Week Tonight with John Oliver by Kid President. The actual Rewind Button was not shown until the end of the video.

2015
On December 9, 2015, YouTube Rewind: Now Watch Me 2015, referencing Silentó's "Watch Me (Whip/Nae Nae)", was released. It was again created and produced by YouTube and Portal A Interactive, and was the first one to feature a hashtag, in this case #YouTubeRewind. The video heavily incorporated references to previous years of YouTube due to 2015 being the year of the website's tenth anniversary. The music mashup was produced by The Hood Internet and included songs such as Major Lazer and DJ Snake's "Lean On", the Weeknd's "Can't Feel My Face", and Justin Bieber's "What Do You Mean?". Additionally, Avicii produced an original remix of "Broken Arrows" for the video. The video featured more gaming personalities than previous years, including Markiplier, CaptainSparklez, MatPat and Smosh Games, with a segment set up to resemble Five Nights at Freddy's. PewDiePie and Zoella makes an appearance halfway through the video, where they're shown next to a scoreboard with two dates of December 9, 2015, a reference to Back to the Future Part II, which is set in 2015. Zoella changes one scoreboard date back to February 14, 2005, leaving the other at December 9, 2015. Afterwards, PewDiePie "brofists" the Rewind button, triggering the video to show past viral videos and memes from 2015 back to 2005. After the credits, the Fine Brothers are shown arguing about whether PewDiePie is actually in the video.

2016
On December 7, 2016, YouTube Rewind: The Ultimate 2016 Challenge, referencing the increasing number of Internet challenges in 2016, was released. It was again created and produced by YouTube and Portal A Interactive. The Hood Internet returned to produce the music mashup for the video, with Major Lazer contributing an original remix of their own. The video begins with Dwayne Johnson showing a miniature Rewind button, and YouTube personalities hunting for Rewind symbols in the style of Pokémon Go. The video also references objects being crushed by a hydraulic press, Hodor from Game of Thrones, the water-bottle flip challenge, "PPAP (Pen-Pineapple-Apple-Pen)" (with Pikotaro himself appearing), and the dabbing dance move. The video also references some of the most popular songs of 2016, including Fifth Harmony's "Work from Home", the Chainsmokers' "Closer", and Beyoncé's "Hold Up". The video ends with James Corden and other personalities in a car, re-enacting the Carpool Karaoke segments from The Late Late Show.

2017
On December 6, 2017, YouTube Rewind: The Shape of 2017, referencing Ed Sheeran's "Shape of You", was released. The video received mixed reviews from critics, YouTubers, and viewers alike following its release. Some of the various criticisms were directed at its overuse of memes, and the notable exclusion of PewDiePie for controversies earlier in the year. To date, it has received over 4.6 million likes. It also received significantly more dislikes than the previous years (excluding 2011), at over 2.3 million dislikes, making it the 35th most-disliked YouTube video of all time.

2018

On December 6, 2018, YouTube Rewind 2018: Everyone Controls Rewind was released. Upon its release, the video was overwhelmingly panned, receiving extensive backlash from critics, YouTubers and viewers alike. Many YouTubers deemed it the "worst Rewind ever". Criticisms ranged from the inclusion of celebrities and personalities who are not affiliated with YouTube (such as Will Smith and Ninja), lack of tributes to recent deaths such as Stephen Hawking, Avicii, TotalBiscuit, Stefán Karl Stefánsson, XXXTentacion, Aretha Franklin, Mac Miller, Stan Lee, and Stephen Hillenburg, as well as the exclusion of certain controversial personalities, such as Shane Dawson and Lil Pump, alongside the rivalries of KSI vs Logan Paul and PewDiePie vs T-Series. 

Everyone Controls Rewind incorporated user comment suggestions as a part of the video, although many viewers stated that the trends that the video included (such as Fortnite and K-pop) were unpopular to the majority of the community, calling YouTube "out of touch" with its viewers and their interests. Julia Alexander, writing for The Verge, suggested that YouTube had intentionally left out the biggest moments on the platform in 2018 in an attempt to appease worried advertisers over controversies that had plagued the platform over the past two years: "it's [...] increasingly apparent, however, that YouTube is trying to sell a culture that's different from the one millions of people come to the platform for, and that's getting harder for both creators and fans to swallow". Meira Gebel of Business Insider shared a similar sentiment, saying that "The video appears to be an attempt for the company to keep advertisers on its side following a rather rocky 2018." In her February YouTube Newsletter, YouTube CEO Susan Wojcicki admits that the video did poorly, saying "Even my kids called it 'cringey' ".

Everyone Controls Rewind is currently the fourth most-disliked YouTube video of all time, with over 20 million dislikes (according to the RYD extension) against 3 million likes . It was also the first video to reach 10 million dislikes. Meanwhile, PewDiePie's take on the video, titled "YouTube Rewind 2018 but it's actually good", claimed the top spot of the most liked non-music videos only two days after being uploaded.

2019

On December 5, 2019, YouTube Rewind 2019: For the Record was released. The 2019 edition returned to a format reminiscent of the first two iterations of the series, featuring a montage of the top videos of 2019, divided into several themed countdowns based on statistics and trends. Kevin Allocca, YouTube's head of culture and trends, explained that the video was intended to be more reflective of the year's trends, acknowledging that it was becoming more difficult for the previous format to "authentically represent" the community's overall experience. The video has been criticized as coming off as “passive-aggressive” towards consumers, or "lazy" as it does not have the same level of production as the previous editions and was noted as being akin to WatchMojo videos. Many also felt the new format lacked energy and a "soul", saying that it showed that YouTube was being openly more corporate.
However, many saw improvement with casting choices in some areas, particularly with the inclusion of PewDiePie, who was absent in previous Rewinds.
Similarly to the previous year, the video was criticized for lacking tributes to personalities who had died in the year, most notably Desmond "Etika" Amofah and Juice WRLD. Despite being included in the 2019 edition, PewDiePie made his own take on the video, titled "YouTube Rewind 2019, but it's actually good".

Cancellation and replacement efforts 
On November 12, 2020, YouTube announced that there would be no Rewind for the year, stating "2020 has been different, And it doesn't feel right to carry on as if it weren't." While the events of the year, including the COVID-19 pandemic and the George Floyd protests, were strongly suggested as the reasons behind the decision, many believed that this was due to the poor reception of the last three installments of the series, leading to speculation that YouTube would cancel the series entirely.

On December 12, 2020, creator Michelle Khare released YouTube Rewind 2020: The Musical onto her own channel after releasing a trailer three days prior. Due to fan backlash over the inclusion of a lookalike of Jenna Marbles, who went on indefinite hiatus from YouTube in June of that year due to controversies related to her earlier videos, the video was set to private.

On January 1, 2021, creator MrBeast made his own version of Rewind called YouTube Rewind 2020: Thank God It's Over. This rewind included many popular YouTubers of that year and was positively received.

On October 7, 2021, YouTube announced that Rewind would be discontinued, expressing hope that its creators would fill in the gap. A 24-hour interactive livestream titled Escape2021 was broadcast on December 16 as a replacement, including a live performance by BTS on Minecraft produced by the Noxcrew and also featured Minecraft YouTubers Dream, GeorgeNotFound, Aphmau, PrestonPlayz, BriannaPlayz and BeckBroJack.

Series videos

Guests
Guests

Released videos

Overview

Behind the Scenes (2012–2018)

Others (2016)

See also
List of most-disliked YouTube videos

Notes

References

External links
Portal-A YouTube Rewind projects:

YouTube Rewind Videos: 

IMDb pages:

2010 web series debuts
2018 controversies
Internet culture
Viral videos
2010s YouTube series
2019 web series endings